François Van Den Bosch (born 8 September 1934) is a former Belgian cyclist. He competed in the individual and team road race events at the 1956 Summer Olympics.

References

External links
 

1934 births
Living people
Belgian male cyclists
Olympic cyclists of Belgium
Cyclists at the 1956 Summer Olympics
Cyclists from Antwerp